Jacob Beetham (born 18 April 2001) is a Welsh rugby union player, currently playing for United Rugby Championship side Cardiff. His preferred position is fly-half or fullback.

Cardiff
Beetham was named in the Cardiff academy squad for the 2021–22 season. He made his debut for Cardiff in the first round of the 2021–22 European Rugby Champions Cup against , starting at fullback.

References

External links
itsrugby.co.uk Profile

2001 births
Living people
Welsh rugby union players
Cardiff Rugby players
Rugby union fly-halves
Rugby union fullbacks